Otohydra is a genus of cnidarians belonging to the monotypic family Otohydridae.

Species:

Otohydra tremulans 
Otohydra vagans

References

Actinulida
Hydrozoan genera